The Neoplan Transliner in Europe is a single-decker inter-urban coach and rental coach built by Neoplan Bus GmbH for the European market in 1990s, of either a single-axle or multi-axle bus design.  Some Dennis Javelin and MAN coaches in the United Kingdom also have the Transliner bodywork.

American market
A transit bus was marketed in the United States as the Neoplan USA Transliner, built by Neoplan USA with the model designations AN430, AN435, AN440 and AN460 for nominal body lengths ranging from  corresponding to the last two digits in the model number (AN4xx). It was first marketed in 1982 and was sold until the manufacturer declared bankruptcy in 2006. These buses were offered with a variety of different engines, wheelchair lifts, or low floor variants.

Indonesian version
The indonesian version build by coachbuilder Adiputro Wirasejati but based model under license Neoplan Bus GmbH and use frame bus Mercedes Benz OH 1521

References

Coaches (bus)
Transliner